Jeringonza is a Spanish language game played by children in Spain and all over Hispanic America. It consists of adding the letter p after each vowel of a word, and repeating the vowel. For example, Carlos turns into Cápar-lopos.

For syllables with multiple vowels, usually only the stressed vowel is used. Australia becomes Apaus-trapa-liapa. Some people treat all vowels alike: they would say Apa-upus-trapa-lipi-apa. Yet another variant inserts the  p+vowel at the end of all syllables instead of just after the vowel: Carlos does not become Cápar-lopos in this version, but Carpa-lospo.

This language game is also known by alternate names in Spanish-speaking countries: jeringozo in Argentina and Uruguay, jerigonzo, jerigonza or jerigoncio in Chile and Colombia, and so on. In other countries it is called simply idioma de la pe (Spanish for P-language) and in Andalucía, "con la pe" (with the P). Most names derive from the Spanish word jerigonza, which can mean either jargon or gibberish.

This game, with almost identical rules but using either the European Portuguese or the Brazilian Portuguese language, is popular with Portuguese and Brazilian children under the name of Língua do Pê (Portuguese for P-language), but the word "geringonça" means a complicated, fragile mechanical contraption.

In other Spanish-speaking countries, similar games add other syllables instead of p+vowel. There are variants that use f instead of p; this is the case, for example, in Italian, where the game is called alfabeto farfallino, meaning "butterfly alphabet", because many modified words sound like farfalla (i.e., "butterfly"). Yet other variants add ti, cuti or chi before each syllable (thus giving ticar-tilós and tiáus-titrá-tiliá for the previous examples).

In Spain, Cuba, Puerto Rico, and the Dominican Republic, chi is used. An example would be: Tú estás enamorado(da) de mí (You are in love with me), which would be said: Chi-tú chi-es chi-tás chi-e chi-na chi-mo chi-ra chi-do(da) chi-de chi-mi.

See also
Farfallino alphabet
Language game
Pig Latin
Ubbi dubbi
Rosarigasino, a similar game from the city of Rosario, Argentina.
Variety (linguistics)

References

External links
Jeringozator, a translator from Spanish to Jeringonza.

Language games
Latin American culture
Spanish language